Smok, the Polish word for "dragon", may refer to:

 Michał Smok, the alias of Anna Henryka Pustowójtówna (1843−1881), Polish nationalist
 Slavic dragon, a mythical creature
 Smok Wawelski, the Wawel Dragon, a famous dragon in Polish folklore
 Smok (archosaur), an extinct reptile genus
 Smok, the ancestor of all living Polish Lowland Sheepdogs

See also 
 Smaug
 
 Schmuck (disambiguation), a Yiddish word derived from the Polish smok